Umaru Nagwamatse Dan Abu Bakar (18061876) was a prince (Nigerian Traditional Ruler) from the Sokoto Caliphate (known as "Sarkin Sudan"), he was a grand son of Usman dan Fodio and the founder of Kontagora Emirate.

Life
Nagwamatse founded the Kontagora Emirate in the year 1864. He became the ruler of the Emirate with his two sons; Modibo and Ibrahim. He was commonly known as Sarkin Sudan, which translates to "King of Blacks" and was the first of the Sokoto Fulani ruling house in the Northern region of Nigeria to become king. Nagwamatse was the tenth son of Sultan Abubakar Atiku, from the Dan Fodio ruling house of Sokoto.

Rijiyar Nagwamatse
The Legend of Rijiyar Nagwamatse states that while the Prince Umaru Nagwamatse was resting beneath a tree in Kontagora, he scratched the earth with his finger, causing water to gush forth miraculously. This led to the birth of the Rijiyar Nagwamatse, and the Nagwamatse well remains a watering spot to this day. The Prince also performed ablution for "Salat Asr" (Islamic Prayer) at this particular site, because the Kingdom lacked drinking water.

Although the Kambari people inhabited the whole of the Kingdom at that time, it is still claimed by the Niger State. In the early 19th century, the Kambari people left the Kingdom because of a civil war in the Magna Kingdom. The ruling family of Umaru Nagwamatse now leads it.

Notes

1806 births
1870 deaths
19th-century Nigerian people
Dan Fodio family
Nigerian traditional rulers